"Lord of the Dance" is a hymn written by English songwriter Sydney Carter in 1963. The melody is from the American Shaker song "Simple Gifts".  The hymn is widely performed in English-speaking congregations and assemblies. 

The song follows the idea of the traditional English carol "Tomorrow Shall Be My Dancing Day", which tells the gospel story in the first-person voice of Jesus of Nazareth with the device of portraying Jesus' life and mission as a dance.

Author's perspective
In writing the lyrics to "Lord of the Dance", Carter was inspired partly by Jesus, but also by a statue of the Hindu deity Shiva as Nataraja (Shiva's dancing pose) which sat on his desk. He later stated, "I did not think the churches would like it at all. I thought many people would find it pretty far flown, probably heretical and anyway dubiously Christian. But in fact people did sing it and, unknown to me, it touched a chord."

Carter wrote:

Reception
Verse 3 of the hymn, which includes the line that "[t]he Holy People said it was a shame", has been analyzed as implying collective Jewish responsibility for the death of Jesus, and therefore conflicting with Catholic doctrine. However, Sydney Carter also criticised holier-than-thou religious attitudes through his other work, including song lyrics such as "The Vicar is a Beatnik" about social conservatives in the Church of England.

Notable recordings
 Martin Carthy and Dave Swarbrick, on the album But Two Came By (1968)
 The McCalmans, on the album Singers Three (1969)
 The Corries, on the live album The Corries In Concert (1969)
 Donovan, on the album HMS Donovan (1971)
 The Dubliners, on the album Now (1975)
 Champions of Europe, "Stand Free", on the album Gothenburg (1983)
 The Bach Choir, on the album Family Carols (1991)
 Charlie Zahm, on his album The Celtic Balladeer (1999)
 Blackmore's Night, on the album Winter Carols (2007)
 Salisbury Cathedral Choir, on the album Great Hymns from Salisbury (2013)
 New World, on "B" side of the single "Kara Kara" (1971)
 Jim Bailey, a cover by a Christian singer songwriter who focused on children’s ministry (2002)

References

External links 
 "Lord of the Dance" and "Simple Gifts"
 Lyrics to "Tomorrow Shall Be My Dancing Day"
  Songs of America - Simple Gifts - Shaker Hymn, 1:40, Cibertracker Imperium. Includes clips of dance.
 I Danced in the Morning (LORD OF THE DANCE), 3:55, First Plymouth Church Lincoln Nebraska

English Christian hymns
Hymn tunes
1963 songs
Works based on Simple Gifts
Songs about dancing
Songs about Jesus
20th-century hymns